The Lovemakers is a 1961 Italian drama film directed by Mauro Bolognini based on a novel by Mario Pratesi. The film which stars Claudia Cardinale and Jean-Paul Belmondo, was entered into the 1961 Cannes Film Festival.

Plot
The original Italian La viaccia is the name of the family farm which motivates the plot. The death of a wealthy patriarch in 1885 sets off an interfamily power struggle. Son Ferdinando buys out his other relatives in order to gain full control over the dead man's property. But Ferdinando's country-bumpkin nephew Amerigo holds out. Amerigo's stance is weakened when he heads for the city and meets prostitute Bianca. To support her in the manner in which she is accustomed, Amerigo steals from his uncle. Disgraced in the eyes of his family, Amerigo decides to stay near his beloved Bianca by becoming a bouncer in her brothel.

Cast
Jean-Paul Belmondo as Amerigo
Claudia Cardinale as Bianca
Pietro Germi as Stefano
Gabriella Pallotta as Carmelinda
Romolo Valli as Dante
Paul Frankeur as Ferdinando
Gina Sammarco as Maîtresse
Marcella Valeri as Beppa
Emma Baron as Giovanna
Franco Balducci as Tognaccio
Claudio Biava  as Arlecchino
Nando Angelini as young man
Duilio D'Amore as Bernardo
Giuseppe Tosi as Casamonti
Paola Pitagora as Anna
Gianna Giachetti as boarder at brothel
Rosita di Vera Cruz as Margherita
Dante Posani as Gustavo
Olimpia Cavalli as boarder
Aurelio Nardi as ball-man
Maurice Poli
Renzo Palmer
Rina Morelli

References

External links
The Mario Pratesi Fonds at the Victoria University Library at the University of Toronto
 
The Lovemakers at Le Film Guide

1960s Italian-language films
1961 films
1961 drama films
Italian black-and-white films
Titanus films
Films directed by Mauro Bolognini
Films scored by Piero Piccioni
1960s Italian films